The following is a list of notable events and releases of the year 1927 in Norwegian music.

Events

Deaths

 June
 17 – Ole Olsen, organist, composer, conductor and military musician (born 1850).

Births

 January
 8 – Nils Grinde, organist, musicologist, and theatre historian (died 2012)

 May
 10 – Eva Knardahl, classical pianist (died 2006).

 June
 13 – Knut Wiggen, composer (died 2016).
 18 – Kjell Lund, architect, songwriter and singer (died 2013).

 November
 8 – Ingrid Bjoner, operatic soprano (died 2006).
 30 – Alfred Næss, playwright and songwriter (died 1997).

 December
 9 – Øistein "Tinka" Ringstad, jazz pianist and vibraphonist (died 1991).

See also
 1927 in Norway
 Music of Norway

References

 
Norwegian music
Norwegian
Music
1920s in Norwegian music